(February 19, 1912 – October 29, 2007) was a Japanese film director and screenwriter.

Born in Tokyo, Japan, he attended Waseda University but left before graduating due to his involvement in a left-wing theater troupe. He joined P.C.L. (a precursor to Toho) in 1933 and began working as an assistant director to Kajirō Yamamoto alongside his longtime friend, acclaimed Japanese filmmaker, Akira Kurosawa. He made his feature film directing debut in 1947 with Snow Trail, which was written by Kurosawa. Snow Trail starred Toshirō Mifune in his film debut and actress Setsuko Wakayama. It helped establish Taniguchi's reputation for action film.

Taniguchi and Wakayama married in 1949 (he had earlier been married to the screenwriter Yōko Mizuki), but the couple divorced in 1956.  Taniguchi married his third wife, actress Kaoru Yachigusa, in 1957. Yachigusa and Taniguchi remained together for over fifty years until his death in 2007.

Taniguchi was the screenwriter for the 1949 film, The Quiet Duel, which Kurosawa directed and which also starred Mifune. His most acclaimed film as a director was Escape at Dawn, a controversial anti-war work from 1950 about a Japanese soldier and a "comfort woman" that got into trouble with Occupation era censors. Taniguchi continued to direct movies throughout the 1950s and 1960s, but the quality of his work declined. His films from the time period include Man Against Man, The Gambling Samurai, A Man in the Storm and The Lost World of Sinbad. His 1965 film International Secret Police: Key of Keys was famously re-dubbed and re-released as What's Up, Tiger Lily? by Woody Allen. He was chosen as the supervising director of the official documentary of Expo '70.

Senkichi Taniguchi died of pneumonia at a hospital in Tokyo, Japan, on October 29, 2007, at the age of 95.

Filmography

Director 
 Snow Trail (銀嶺の果て, Ginrei no hate) (1947)
 Jakoman and Tetsu (ジャコ万と鉄, Jakoman to Tetsu) (1949), from a script by Akira Kurosawa
 Escape at Dawn (暁の脱走, Akatsuki no dassō) (1950)
 Foghorn (霧笛, Muteki) (1952)
 Rangiku monogatari (乱菊物語) (1956)
 The Lost World of Sinbad (大盗賊, Daitōzoku) (1963)
 International Secret Police: Key of Keys (国際秘密警察 鍵の鍵, Kokusai himitsu keisatsu: Kagi no kagi) (1965)

Screenplay only 
 The Quiet Duel (静かなる決闘, Shizukanaru kettō) (1949)

External links
 

 Taniguchi Senkichi no shigoto 2010 retrospective of Taniguchi's work (in Japanese)

References

1912 births
2007 deaths
Japanese film directors
Samurai film directors
People from Tokyo
Deaths from pneumonia in Japan
20th-century Japanese screenwriters